Jo-Ann Roslyn Miller (born 22 August 1958) is an Australian politician. She was a Labor Party member of the Legislative Assembly of Queensland between February 2000 and February 2020, representing the electorate of Bundamba.

Miller entered parliament in a 2000 by-election upon the resignation of the former member for Bundamba, Bob Gibbs. Bundamba was considered a safe seat for the Labor Party, and Miller won all the elections in the seat from 2001 to 2017. 

Following Labor's defeat in the 2012 election, Miller was elevated to the frontbench. On 16 February 2015 she was sworn in as Minister for Police, Fire and Emergency Services and Minister for Corrective Services in the Palaszczuk Ministry.

On 4 December 2015, Miller resigned from cabinet following a Queensland Parliamentary Ethics Committee Report stating that although she had not been guilty of contempt of Parliament, she had engaged in a "pattern of reckless conduct." The committee's investigation focused on revelations Miller had signed a document stating she had correctly disposed of confidential Parliamentary Crime and Corruption Committee papers, which were later found by an Opposition MP in a safe used to store those papers.

Her resignation came one day after Premier Annastacia Palaszczuk signalled her intention to remove Miller from her portfolios.

In October 2018, Miller voted against the government's successful proposal to decriminalise abortion in Queensland, making her the only Labor Party MP to do so.

In January 2020, it was reported that Miller was considering resigning her seat in order to contest the City of Ipswich mayoral election, to be held on 28 March. Miller resigned as the Member for Bundamba on 20 February 2020, but announced she would not seek election to Ipswich City Council.

References

1958 births
Living people
Members of the Queensland Legislative Assembly
Australian Labor Party members of the Parliament of Queensland
Labor Left politicians
21st-century Australian politicians
21st-century Australian women politicians
Women members of the Queensland Legislative Assembly